Sun, Wine and Hard Nuts (German: Sonne, Wein und harte Nüsse) is a West German crime television series broadcast on ARD.

A retired German police inspector goes to live on the French Riviera with his sister, but soon becomes involved helping the local police solve crimes. The show was a follow up to Erik Ode's role in the long-running Munich-set detective show Der Kommissar. The role of his sister was played by his real-life wife Hilde Volk. The series was shot on location in Provence.

Other actors who appeared in the series include Jane Tilden, Barbara Valentin, Karin Hardt, Marianne Wischmann, Carl-Heinz Schroth, Howard Vernon, Brigitte Horney, Wolfgang Kieling, Wolfgang Preiss, Lukas Ammann, Andrea Rau, Silvia Reize, Rudolf Schündler, Reinhard Kolldehoff, Heli Finkenzeller, Ivan Desny and Iris Berben. Reinhard Glemnitz who had been a cast member of Der Kommissar also featured in the series, with several in-jokes referring to his earlier role.

Main cast
 Erik Ode as Eric Ott
 Hilde Volk as Ilse Ott
 Hans-Joachim Frick as Jean Giraud
 Marianne Borgo as Claudine
 Jean-Pierre Zola as Jeannot

References

Bibliography
Hans-Michael Bock and Tim Bergfelder. The Concise Cinegraph: An Encyclopedia of German Cinema. Berghahn Books, 2009.

External links
 

1977 German television series debuts
1981 German television series endings
1970s crime television series
1980s crime television series
German-language television shows
German crime television series